Massachusetts House of Representatives' 3rd Berkshire district in the United States is one of 160 legislative districts included in the lower house of the Massachusetts General Court. It covers part of Pittsfield in Berkshire County. Democrat Tricia Farley-Bouvier of Pittsfield has represented the district since 2011.

The current district geographic boundary overlaps with that of the Massachusetts Senate's Berkshire, Hampshire, Franklin and Hampden district.

Representatives
 Edward Larned, circa 1858 
 Julius Rockwell, circa 1858 
 Henry Colt, circa 1859 
 John A. Walker, circa 1859 
 Samuel M. Raymond, circa 1888 
 Elmer L. McCulloch, circa 1920 
 Thomas Edward Enright, circa 1951 
 William Kitterman, circa 1975 
 Robert Jakubowicz, circa 1990
 Peter J. Larkin, 1991–2005
 Christopher Speranzo, 2005–2011
 Tricia Farley-Bouvier, 2011-current

Former locales
The district previously covered:
 Dalton, circa 1872 
 Richmond, circa 1872

See also
 Other Berkshire County districts of the Massachusetts House of Representatives: 1st, 2nd, 4th
 List of Massachusetts House of Representatives elections
 List of Massachusetts General Courts
 List of former districts of the Massachusetts House of Representatives

Images

References

External links
 Ballotpedia
  (State House district information based on U.S. Census Bureau's American Community Survey).

House
Government of Berkshire County, Massachusetts